The Myanma Foreign Trade Bank (abbreviated MFTB) is a state-owned bank specializing in foreign banking. Its provides trade finance and foreign exchange-related banking to the government, state enterprises, and the international community residing in Myanmar. MFTB also manages Burma's official foreign currency reserves. Until recent economic reforms, MFTB had a monopoly on foreign exchange and customer base.

The bank was established under the Financial Institutions of Myanmar Law of 1990.

References

Banks of Myanmar
Banks established in 1990
1990 establishments in Myanmar
Yangon
Entities related to Myanmar sanctions